Sinjai Plengpanich (born January 21, 1965), née Sinjai Hongtai, is a Thai actress who started her career as a model. She has acted in numerous lakorn (Thai soap operas) as well as films and theatrical productions. In 2007, she starred in the critically acclaimed The Love of Siam, and also acted in a revival of the stage production, Banlangmek: The Musical. In 2013 remake of Khu Kam, Sinjai portrayed Thanphuying La-iat Phibunsongkhram, wife of Field Marshal Plaek Phibunsongkhram, former Prime Minister and military dictator.

She is married to actor Chatchai Plengpanich, and the two share the same nickname, Nok (นก; meaning in Thai: bird). She has 2 sons and a daughter, named Gun, Bom, and Dom.


Filmography

Films

Television

Producer

References

External links

1965 births
Living people
Sinjai Plengpanich
Sinjai Plengpanich
Sinjai Plengpanich
Sinjai Plengpanich
Sinjai Plengpanich
Sinjai Plengpanich